Soufyan Ahannach (born 9 September 1995) is a Dutch professional footballer who plays as a winger for Al-Rawdhah, on loan from Al-Arabi.

Club career
Ahannach started his professional career with Eerste Divisie side Almere City scoring 32 goals in 97 appearances, before moving on to England.

On 10 August 2017, Ahannach signed for Premier League club Brighton & Hove Albion on a five-year contract. He was loaned out to Sparta Rotterdam of the Eredivisie for the 2017–18 season where he scored once in twelve appearances. Ahannach signed for Belgian second tier side Union SG on 2 September 2019 on a season-long loan.

Ahannach returned to Brighton in January 2020 where he was released. He then signed with Go Ahead Eagles for the remainder of the season. 

On 2 February 2021, it was announced that Ahannach had signed with FC Den Bosch. The move reunited him with Jack de Gier, his manager at Almere City. 

On 9 June 2022, Ahannach joined Saudi Arabian side Al-Arabi. On 2 January 2023, Ahannach joined Al-Rawdhah on loan.

International career
On 26 March 2013, Ahannach gained a cap for the Netherlands U18 team in a friendly against Germany. He came on as a substitute in the 74th minute for Jorrit Hendrix.

Career statistics

Personal life
His older brother Alami Ahannach is a football coach and a former Moroccan international footballer. His cousin Anass Ahannach is also a footballer.

Ahannach is a Muslim, and follows the purist salafist branch of the religion. He wears a beard with a trimmed moustache and observes the salah five times daily.

References

External links
 

1995 births
Living people
Footballers from Amsterdam
Dutch footballers
Dutch expatriate footballers
Association football wingers
AFC DWS players
Almere City FC players
Brighton & Hove Albion F.C. players
Sparta Rotterdam players
Go Ahead Eagles players
FC Den Bosch players
Al-Arabi SC (Saudi Arabia) players
Al-Rawdhah Club players
Eredivisie players
Eerste Divisie players
Saudi First Division League players
Saudi Second Division players
Expatriate footballers in England
Dutch expatriate sportspeople in England
Dutch sportspeople of Moroccan descent
Netherlands youth international footballers
Expatriate footballers in Belgium
Dutch expatriate sportspeople in Belgium
Expatriate footballers in Saudi Arabia
Dutch expatriate sportspeople in Saudi Arabia
Dutch Muslims
Salafis